Anjuvannam (in Tamil and Malayalam, from Persian anjuman, and hanjama or hanjamana in Telugu or Kannada or hamyamana) typically refers to a medieval merchant guild, consisting of non-Indian traders (ethnic Persians and Arabs), primarily active in south India. Along with manigramam and ainurruvar (the Ayyavole Five Hundred), the anjuvannam merchant guild played a major role in the commercial activities of the region. Unlike manigiramam, which was also operating in Indian hinterland, the presence of anjuvannam is found only in coastal towns. 

The guild of anjuvannam was organised by West Asian traders that included Jewish, Syrian Christian, Muslim and Zoroastrian Parsi merchants operating in south India (mostly Indian Ocean trade). Historian Y. Subbarayalu had defined the anjuvannam guild as a "body of West Asian traders". The merchants generally operated in the trading ports of Konkan, Malabar Coast and Coromandel Coast of south India (and even in South East Asia including Java). In some ports this guild obtained royal charters, which permitted the special immunities and privileges within those cities. Anjuvannam finds mention in number of south Indian inscriptions, most notably in Quilon Syrian copper plates (c. 849 CE) and in Jewish copper plates of Cochin (c. 1000 CE). The increased association of the guild with the Jewish traders of Malabar Coast is visible in the latter inscription.

The earliest concrete epigraphical evidence of anjuvannam is the Quilon Syrian copper plates (c. 849 CE). The guild was active on the Kerala coast in the 9th century CE. From the early 10th century, ainurruvar (the Ayyavole Five Hundred) guild spread throughout south India bringing under its umbrella most of the pre-existing guilds. Both anjuvannam and manigiramam were incorporated into the Five Hundred. In and after 12th century, the Five Hundred acted as an umbrella organisation to cover all the other smaller merchant guilds. During the 11th - 13th centuries anjuvannam was mostly composed of Muslim traders on both the west and east coasts of India.

A person in the Anjuvannam community is known as an "anjuvannan".

Etymology

See also
 Cochin Jews
 Manigramam
 Trade guilds of South India

References

External links
 Historian Y. Subbarayalu on Anjuvannam

Cochin Jews
Judaism in Kerala
Social groups of Kerala
Guilds in India
Indian merchants
Economic history of India